Bruckner Glacier, is a glacier in eastern Greenland.

Geography 
The Bruckner Glacier originates in the Eastern side of the Greenland Ice Sheet. It has its terminus in the eastern side of the head of Johan Petersen Fjord separated by nunataks from the terminus of the Heim Glacier. 

Together the Bruckner and Heim glaciers discharge icebergs into the inner part of the fjord.

Bibliography
Climate-related glacier fluctuations in southeast Greenland

See also
List of glaciers in Greenland

References

External links
Southeast Greenland glaciers to warm Atlantic Water from Operation IceBridge and Ocean Melting Greenland data - ResearchGate 
Grönland, Angmassalik Region, Tiniteqlaaq, Brückner Gletscher (Eiskappe) und Johan Petersen Fjord
Glaciers of Greenland